Zelda 3DS may refer to:

The Legend of Zelda: Ocarina of Time 3D, a 2011 remake of The Legend of Zelda: Ocarina of Time
The Legend of Zelda: A Link Between Worlds, a 2013 sequel to The Legend of Zelda: A Link to the Past
The Legend of Zelda: Majora's Mask 3D, a 2015 remake of The Legend of Zelda: Majora's Mask
The Legend of Zelda: Tri Force Heroes, a 2015 video game